In stochastic calculus, the Kunita–Watanabe inequality is a generalization of the Cauchy–Schwarz inequality to integrals of stochastic processes.
It was first obtained by Hiroshi Kunita and Shinzo Watanabe and plays a fundamental role in their extension of Ito's stochastic integral to square-integrable martingales.

Statement of the theorem 
Let M, N be continuous local martingales and H, K measurable processes. Then

 

where the angled brackets indicates the quadratic variation and quadratic covariation operators. The integrals are understood in the Lebesgue–Stieltjes sense.

References

Probability theorems
Probabilistic inequalities